In Greek mythology, Cleito (Ancient Greek: Κλειτὼ means "renowned, famous") may refer to the following:

 Cleito, an Atlantian, daughter of the autochthon Evenor and Leucippe. When she reached a marriageable age, both her parents died, and the sea-god Poseidon, after falling in love with Cleito married her. They had five pairs of twins, namely: Atlas and Eumelus, Ampheres and Evaemon, Mneseus and Autochthon, Elasippus and Mestor, and lastly, Azaes and Diaprepes.
 Cleito, mother of Hellus, one of the Trojan warriors who was killed by the Achaean leader Eurypylus during the siege of Troy.

Notes

References 

 Quintus Smyrnaeus, The Fall of Troy translated by Way. A. S. Loeb Classical Library Volume 19. London: William Heinemann, 1913. Online version at theio.com
 Quintus Smyrnaeus, The Fall of Troy. Arthur S. Way. London: William Heinemann; New York: G.P. Putnam's Sons. 1913. Greek text available at the Perseus Digital Library.
Plato, Critias in Plato in Twelve Volumes, Vol. 9 translated by W.R.M. Lamb. Cambridge, Massachusetts, Harvard University Press; London, William Heinemann Ltd. 1925. Online version at the Perseus Digital Library. Greek text is available on the same website.

Women of Poseidon
Atlanteans
Atlantis